This England is a quarterly magazine published in England. It has a large readership among expatriates. It concentrates on the traditional values and customs of the English people, particularly those of rural and small-town England.

History
The magazine was started in 1968 by Roy Faiers of Lincolnshire, who held it as a private company (This England International Ltd.). Faiers remained editor-in-chief until 2009, when he sold the company to DC Thomson, owners of the Sunday Post, Beano, Dandy, The People's Friend, My Weekly and other publications. Faiers was succeeded as editor by his former deputy editor, Stephen Garnett, who in turn was succeeded by current editor, Angela Linforth.

The name This England comes from the declamations of John of Gaunt in Act II, Scene I of  Shakespeare's King Richard II: "This royal throne of kings, this sceptred isle... This blessed plot, this earth, this realm, this England."

Content
The magazine started with the slogan "As refreshing as a cup of tea!" Later issues described themselves as "For all those who love this green and pleasant land", and "Britain's loveliest magazine since 1968".

This England has always editorially described itself as a publication with an emphasis on Christian conservative values. It has sometimes been known, however, as a voice of political activism. For most of its years the magazine featured a strong pro-British, Eurosceptic editorial outlook. It showcased articles against the European Union and related topics like metrication.

Jeremy Paxman remarked that the magazine's greatest enemy was "the march of time", claiming that "not one article in the magazine looks forward to the future".

The magazine's main content remains focused on English cultural history and lore. Regular features include "A Royal History of England", "Literary Landscapes of England", "London Pride", "English Excursions", "Historic Homes of England", "Great Britons" and "Made in England" where English achievement, creativity and enterprise in the 21st century are highlighted.

This England has a sister publication, Evergreen, which features less national content and concentrates on village life.  Another companion publication, Beautiful Britain, was launched in 2006, aimed at a younger audience but which closed after a relatively short time.

References

External links
 This England (publisher's site)

1967 in England
Quarterly magazines published in the United Kingdom
Magazines published in England
Euroscepticism in the United Kingdom
English nationalism
Local interest magazines published in the United Kingdom
Magazines established in 1967